The Hopestill Bent Tavern is a historic First Period tavern (now a private residence) in Wayland, Massachusetts, United States.  The oldest portion of this -story building was built on this site c. 1710, and consisted of two rooms with a central chimney. Around 1800 a second First Period structure was moved to the site and attached to the first, giving the building most of its present form. The building is also unusual for the period in that some of its rooms have no fireplace, and that the upstairs exhibits evidence of significant reuse of older building materials, a practice that was generally restricted to the attic or basement. The building exhibits modest Federal styling, in keeping with the c. 1800 alterations. Its builder and first proprietor was Hopestill Bent (1672–1725).

The building was listed on the National Register of Historic Places in 1990.

See also
 National Register of Historic Places listings in Middlesex County, Massachusetts

References

Drinking establishments on the National Register of Historic Places in Massachusetts
Houses on the National Register of Historic Places in Middlesex County, Massachusetts
Taverns in Massachusetts
Buildings and structures in Wayland, Massachusetts